Stanstead is a village and civil parish in Suffolk, England. The name Stanstead comes from the Old English for "Stony place".

Etymology
The name Stanstead is Anglo Saxon for "stony place" and it is easy to appreciate how this came about when viewing the surrounding fields, particularly in the lower part of the village, which are strewn with glacial flint. There is much evidence of earlier Iron Age and Roman settlements in the surrounding area.

Geography
Stanstead is situated in Glem Valley to the north east of Sudbury.  The Parish borders Long Melford in the west, Glemsford to the south, Boxted to the east and Shimpling to the north.

The village is "T shaped", the lower half of the settlement (Lower Street) follows the B1066 along the bottom of the valley past the old Stanstead osier beds.  The upper part of the village is reached by a 30-metre climb up the hill past Stanstead Hall towards the church and a cluster of houses, a small green and then on to Upper Street and Blooms Hall Lane.

Governance
Stanstead lies in the Babergh district of the shire county of Suffolk. The three tiers of local government are administered by

 Suffolk County Council
 Babergh District Council
 Stanstead Parish Council

Transport
Shimpling is served by one bus service operated by Hedingham & Chambers:

Education
The village is served by Hartest CEVCP School, a primary school currently catering for pupils aged 5–11.

Older children attend Sudbury Upper School and Arts College.

Demography
According to the Office for National Statistics, at the time of the United Kingdom Census 2001, Stanstead had a population of 316 with 127 households.

Population change

Notable former residents
 Robert Calef (1648 - 1719), cloth merchant in colonial Boston and author.
 Edmund Rice (c.1594 – 1663), politician and founder of Marlborough, Massachusetts

References

External links

Parish Council website
St James's Church Suffolk Churches

Villages in Suffolk
Babergh District
Civil parishes in Suffolk